The African foam-nest tree frog or western foam-nest tree frog (Chiromantis rufescens) is a species of frog found in the tropical rainforests of Central Africa. The species has been found in nations ranging from Uganda to Sierra Leone, and has been found on the island of Bioko in Equatorial Guinea. It is likely to live in other nations in the region too, such as Angola but no scientific sightings have been recorded.

This species builds nests of foam above temporary pools and other water bodies.

See also 

 Chiromantis petersii
 Grey foam-nest tree frog
 Chiromantis kelleri

References 

Chiromantis
Frogs of Africa
Amphibians described in 1869
Taxa named by Albert Günther